Herpele squalostoma is a species of caecilian in the family Herpelidae. It is also known by the common name Congo caecilian. It is found in Central and extreme easternmost West Africa (southeastern Nigeria, Cameroon, western Central African Republic, Equatorial Guinea (including Bioko), Gabon, Republic of the Congo, western Democratic Republic of the Congo, and possibly the Cabinda Province of Angola).

Description
The holotype measures . The snout is prominent. The eyes are covered with bone and not visible externally. There are fewer than 135 primary annuli (116–132 in a sample of 112 specimens) and 12–16 secondary annuli that do not reach round the body. In preservative, the body is dark olive in colour and is marked with minute yellowish spots.

Reproduction
The largest known eggs of this species measure . As other herpelids, Herpele squalostoma is probably oviparous. Furthermore, it provides parental care: the young feed on their mother's skin (they are "dermatophagous").

Habitat and conservation
Herpele squalostoma occurs in lowland forest, and it can also occur in fruit tree plantations, rural gardens and secondary forest. It is presumably largely fossorial.

Herpele squalostoma occurs in small numbers in the international pet trade, but it is not known whether this could be a threat. Batrachochytrium dendrobatidis has been detected in this species, and thus chytridiomycosis is a potential threat. Herpele squalostoma is found in many protected areas, including the Korup National Park in Cameroon and the Moukalaba-Doudou National Park in Gabon.

References 

squalostoma
Amphibians of Cameroon
Amphibians of the Central African Republic
Amphibians of the Democratic Republic of the Congo
Amphibians of Equatorial Guinea
Amphibians of Gabon
Fauna of Nigeria
Amphibians of the Republic of the Congo
Amphibians of West Africa
Taxa named by Samuel Stutchbury
Amphibians described in 1836
Taxonomy articles created by Polbot